War in Afghanistan, Afghan war, or Afghan civil war may refer to:
Conquest of Afghanistan by Alexander the Great (330 BC – 327 BC)
Muslim conquests of Afghanistan (637–709)
Conquest of Afghanistan by the Mongol Empire (13th century), see also Mongol invasion of Central Asia (1216–1222)
Mughal conquests in Afghanistan (1526)
Afghan Civil War (1863–1869), a civil war between Sher Ali Khan and Mohammad Afzal Khan's faction after the death of Dost Mohammad Khan
Anglo−Afghan Wars (first involvement of the British Empire in Afghanistan via the British Raj)
First Anglo−Afghan War (1839–1842)
Second Anglo−Afghan War (1878–1880)
Third Anglo−Afghan War (1919)
Panjdeh incident (1885), first major incursion into Afghanistan by the Russian Empire during the Great Game (1830–1907) with the United Kingdom of Britain and Ireland
First Afghan Civil War (1928–1929), revolts by the Shinwari and the Saqqawists, the latter of whom managed to take over Kabul for a 9-month period
Afghanistan conflict (1978–present)
Saur Revolution (1978), communist insurrection against the Republic of Afghanistan government by the People's Democratic Party of Afghanistan
Soviet–Afghan War (1979–1989), war between the Afghan mujahideens, which were supported by the United States as part of the Cold War, and the Soviet Union following intervention of the Soviet Armed Forces in support of the Communist-led Democratic Republic of Afghanistan government
Second Afghan Civil War (1989–1992), collapse of the Afghan Communist government of Mohammad Najibullah
Third Afghan Civil War (1992–1996), expansion of the Taliban across most of Afghanistan and establishment of the Taliban-ruled Islamic Emirate of Afghanistan in 1996
Fourth Afghan Civil War (1996–2001), lead-up to the 2001 United States invasion of Afghanistan, during which the Taliban controlled most of Afghanistan, with the Northern Alliance controlling northern Afghanistan
War in Afghanistan (2001–2021), multiple stages:
United States invasion of Afghanistan against the Taliban and al-Qaeda in 2001
Combatting the Taliban insurgency with the International Security Assistance Force (a coalition of countries including all NATO members) from 2001 to 2014
Resolute Support Mission phase consisting of anti-insurgency operations against the Taliban, al-Qaeda, and ISIL from 2014 to 2021
2021 Taliban offensive, Taliban victory and fall of the Islamic Republic of Afghanistan
Islamic State–Taliban conflict (2015–present)
Republican insurgency in Afghanistan (2021–present), a conflict between ruling Taliban militias and rebels

References

Former disambiguation pages converted to set index articles
Military history of Afghanistan